The Île de Sein  is a Breton island in the Atlantic Ocean, off Finistère, eight kilometres from the Pointe du Raz (raz meaning "water current"), from which it is separated by the Raz de Sein. Its Breton name is Enez-Sun. The island, with its neighbouring islets, forms the commune of Île-de-Sein in the Finistère department of Brittany in north-western France. Inhabitants of Île-de-Sein are called in French Sénans.

Lying on the sea routes going south from the English Channel, Sein is well known for the dangers of its waters, the Chaussée de Sein, a vast zone of reefs stretching more than 30 miles from east to west, requiring numerous lighthouses, beacons, and buoys. The lighthouses near the reef  include Ar Men, La Vieille and Tévennec.

History 
There are two megalithic menhirs on the island, which is flat and treeless.

It is mentioned by the Roman geographer Pomponius Mela.

The island women used to wear a black headdress, and in the past, they had a reputation for enticing sailors onto the rocks by witchcraft. In the past, it was also known for its wreckers.

During World War II, German forces occupied the island.  The Île de Sein lighthouse (Le Phare de Goulenez), built in 1839 at the north-western end was destroyed - it was later rebuilt in 1952.  After hearing General de Gaulle's call to resistance during World War II in his appeal to the French on 18 June 1940, every male inhabitant aged between 14 and 54 (or 60, according to the island's official website) (variously totalled as 114 to 128) set sail in their fishing boats for Britain to join the Free French forces. For this, on 1 January 1946, the community was awarded the high honour of the Order of the Liberation.

During the 1960s, French artists Maurice Boitel and Jean Rigaud painted on the Île de Sein.

It is featured in the 1995 French film Élisa.

Geography

Climate
Île de Sein has a oceanic climate (Köppen climate classification Cfb).

Legend
According to Breton legend, Île de Sein was once home to a group of virgin druid priestesses called the Gallizenae. They are said to have had the power to predict the future, to calm the winds, and to take the forms of different animals.

See also 
Communes of the Finistère department
Parc naturel régional d'Armorique
Sea level rise

Further reading 
Queffélec, Henri, Un recteur de l'île de Sein, Éditions Bartillat, Paris, 1999,

References

External links 

  State Lighthouse "la VIEILLE" dated April 19, 2009
  State Lighthouse "Enez-Sun" dated April 19, 2009

Having defied the Nazis,Islanders take on the sea 23. July.2012 The New York Times
Mayors of Finistère Association 

Landforms of Finistère
Sein
Companions of the Liberation
Communes of Finistère